Paul Jefferson Javier Vivas (born 26 May 1991) is a Filipino badminton player. He achieved his career-high ranking of 51 in men's doubles on the BWF World Ranking in 2015.

Career 
In 2014, Paul partnered with Peter Gabriel Magnaye and they beat Baptiste Carême and Ronan Labar of France to win their first ever title at the Swiss International.

Achievements

BWF International Challenge/Series 
Men's doubles

  BWF International Challenge tournament
  BWF International Series tournament

References

External links 
 

1991 births
Living people
Sportspeople from Bulacan
Filipino male badminton players
Competitors at the 2011 Southeast Asian Games
Competitors at the 2013 Southeast Asian Games
Competitors at the 2015 Southeast Asian Games
Southeast Asian Games competitors for the Philippines